Sándorfalva is a town in Csongrád-Csanád County, in the Southern Great Plain region of southern Hungary.

Geography

Population

References

External links

  in Hungarian

Populated places in Csongrád-Csanád County